"Cleopatra's Theme" is a song by British R&B girl group Cleopatra from their first album, Comin' Atcha! (1998). Their debut single, it reached number three on the UK Singles Chart and reached number 26 on the US Billboard Hot 100. It was their only song to reach the top 40 in the United States, where Cleopatra promoted the song by appearing on several children's programming blocks.

Critical reception
Larry Flick from Billboard wrote, "Are ya ready for the female equivalent of Hanson? This U.K. teen trio has already won the ardent approval of kids throughout much of Europe on the strength of a light-funk groove, a candy-sweet chorus, and charmingly girlish harmonies. Precocious lead singer Cleopatra Higgins has the makings of a baby diva, as she vamps with a surprisingly soulful hand." He added further, "Early reaction from top 40 programmers here hints that this adorable sister act's music will be on the lips of mall America within seconds. "Cleopatra's Theme" is just one of numerous tasty treats to be discovered on the forthcoming full-length debut, Comin' Atcha! You'll be hearing just about all of 'em soon enough." Chuck Campbell from Knoxville News Sentinel said, "Granted, this song is infectious, especially when the girls' voices sweep together into the light R&B hook." Ian Hyland from Sunday Mirror gave it nine out of ten, constating that "this group of hip-hopping Manchester teens are some serious soul divas in the making. Keep a look out."

Music video
The music video directed by Max & Daria for the song consists of the girls singing and dancing in their room, after being told by their mother to come down stairs to the kitchen. The video received airplay on U.S. channels, such as Disney Channel, Nickelodeon, MTV, and BET.

Track listings
 UK, European, and Australian CD single
 "Cleopatra's Theme" (radio edit) – 3:51
 "Cleopatra's Theme" (D+A mix) – 4:17
 "Cleopatra's Theme" (Brooklyn Funk R&B mix) – 5:11
 "Cleopatra's Theme" (Brooklyn Funk club mix) – 6:08
 "Cleopatra's Theme" (Booker T's Mass Fusion Lick) – 5:52

 UK cassette single and US CD single
 "Cleopatra's Theme" (radio edit) – 3:51
 "Cleopatra's Theme" (D+A mix) – 4:17

Charts

Weekly charts

Year-end charts

Certifications

Release history

References

1998 debut singles
1998 songs
Maverick Records singles
Warner Music Group singles